In enzymology, a methylmalonyl-CoA decarboxylase is an enzyme that catalyzes the chemical reaction

(S)-methylmalonyl-CoA  propanoyl-CoA + CO2

Hence, this enzyme has one substrate, (S)-methylmalonyl-CoA, and two products, propanoyl-CoA and CO2. Along with this reaction, this enzyme transports sodium cations across the membrane, creating a gradient which can be used for synthesis of ATP, hence its classification as a translocase.

This enzyme belongs to the family of lyases, specifically the carboxy-lyases, which cleave carbon-carbon bonds.  The systematic name of this enzyme class is (S)-methylmalonyl-CoA carboxy-lyase (propanoyl-CoA-forming). Other names in common use include propionyl-CoA carboxylase, propionyl coenzyme A carboxylase, methylmalonyl-coenzyme A decarboxylase, (S)-2-methyl-3-oxopropanoyl-CoA carboxy-lyase [incorrect], and (S)-methylmalonyl-CoA carboxy-lyase.  This enzyme participates in propanoate metabolism.

Structural studies

References

 
 
 

EC 4.1.1
Enzymes of known structure